The 1986 ABN World Tennis Tournament was a men's tennis tournament played on indoor carpet courts at Rotterdam Ahoy in the Netherlands that was part of the 1986 Nabisco Grand Prix. It was the 14th edition of the tournament and was held from 24 March through 30 March 1986. Fourth-seeded Joakim Nyström won the singles title.

Finals

Singles

 Joakim Nyström defeated  Anders Järryd 6–0, 6–3

Doubles

 Stefan Edberg /  Slobodan Živojinović defeated  Wojciech Fibak /  Matt Mitchell 2–6, 6–3, 6–2

References

External links
 Official website 
 Official website 
 ATP tournament profile
 ITF tournament details

 
ABN World Tennis Tournament
ABN World Tennis Tournament
ABN World Tennis Tournament